Spruce Pine is a census-designated place and unincorporated community in Franklin County, Alabama, United States. Its population was 222 as of the 2010 census.

Demographics

References

Census-designated places in Franklin County, Alabama
Census-designated places in Alabama
Unincorporated communities in Franklin County, Alabama
Unincorporated communities in Alabama